Georg Gerstäcker (3 June 1889 – 21 December 1949) was a German wrestler who competed in the 1912 Summer Olympics. He won the silver medal in the featherweight event.

References

External links
 

1889 births
1949 deaths
Wrestlers at the 1912 Summer Olympics
German male sport wrestlers
Olympic wrestlers of Germany
Olympic silver medalists for Germany
Olympic medalists in wrestling
Medalists at the 1912 Summer Olympics
Sportspeople from Nuremberg